U.S. Route 25 (US 25) is a  U.S. Highway that travels from Brunswick, Georgia to the Kentucky–Ohio state line, where Covington, Kentucky meets Cincinnati, Ohio at the Ohio River. In the U.S. state of South Carolina, it travels south to north in the western part of the state, serving the northern part of the Augusta metropolitan area, Greenwood, and Greenville on its path from North Augusta to North Carolina in the Saluda Mountains, near Travelers Rest.

Route description

ADHS corridor W
US 25, from I-85 to the North Carolina state line, is part of the Appalachian Development Highway System (ADHS), which is part of Appalachian Regional Commission (ARC).  Of the  section of US 25, only  was authorized for ADHS funding.  In the 2013 fiscal year, South Carolina completed Corridor W and also became the first state to complete its entire ADHS miles among all 13 Appalachian states.  The entire section of US 25 along Corridor W boasts a four-to-six-lane limited-access road, with interchanges at major intersections.

History
Established in 1928 as an original U.S. Highway, it was assigned to the entirety of SC 21, which was removed the same year. Traveling closely as it does today, it went from North Augusta to Travelers Rest, connecting the cities and towns of Edgefield, Greenwood, Ware Shoals, and Greenville.

In 1937, US 25 was rerouted in Greenville, moving onto College Avenue from Main Street to Buncombe Street.  By 1961, US 25 was moved onto a new bypass east of North Augusta, leaving US 25 Bus. In 1963, Ware Shoals was bypassed east, leaving another US 25 Bus.  In 1964, US 25 was rerouted onto new primary routing east of Travelers Rest, leaving Main Street to US 276 and Poinsett Highway downgraded to secondary (today now an unsigned US 25 Conn).

By 1969, US 25 was rerouted onto a western bypass of Greenville, replacing SC 250; the old alignment was replaced by US 25 Bus.  Also in the same year, US 25 was given its current eastern bypass around Greenwood, leaving US 25 Bus along its old alignment along Main and Montague Streets.  In 1973, US 25 was rerouted in northern Greenville County onto new modern ascent along the Saluda Mountains; the old route was downgraded to secondary (Old Highway 25 - S-23-969).

South Carolina Highway 21

South Carolina Highway 21 (SC 21) was an original state highway that was established on a path from the Georgia state line at North Augusta to the North Carolina state line at Caesars Head State Park, northwest of Cleveland.

In about 1925, the portion north of Travelers Rest was shifted to the east, replacing the path of SC 29, with its northern terminus at the North Carolina state line at a point north-northeast of Cleveland. Its former path became SC 211 and is now part of US 276.

By the end of 1926, the path of the highway between Edgefield and Kirksey was re-routed, replacing part of SC 43.

In 1928, SC 21 was decommissioned, with its path replaced by US 25.

Major intersections

See also
 
 
 Special routes of U.S. Route 25

References

External links

 
 US 25 at Virginia Highways' South Carolina Highways Annex

 South Carolina
25
Transportation in Aiken County, South Carolina
Transportation in Edgefield County, South Carolina
Transportation in Greenwood County, South Carolina
Transportation in Laurens County, South Carolina
Transportation in Greenville County, South Carolina
North Augusta, South Carolina
Greenwood, South Carolina